Alexander Fuchs (born 5 January 1997) is a German professional footballer who plays as a midfielder.

References

External links
 

1997 births
Living people
Footballers from Munich
German footballers
German expatriate footballers
Association football midfielders
TSV 1860 Munich II players
1. FC Nürnberg II players
1. FC Nürnberg players
SpVgg Unterhaching players
SK Austria Klagenfurt players
Regionalliga players
2. Bundesliga players
Bundesliga players
3. Liga players
Austrian Football Bundesliga players
Expatriate footballers in Austria
German expatriate sportspeople in Austria